Michel Houellebecq (born 26 February 1956 or 1958) is a French writer and occasional actor, film director and singer.

Novels
Extension du domaine de la lutte (1994, Maurice Nadeau, trans. as Whatever by Paul Hammond, 1998)
Les Particules élémentaires (1998, Flammarion, trans. as Atomised by Frank Wynne, 2000; published in the US as The Elementary Particles)
Lanzarote (2000, trans. by Frank Wynne, 2002) (short novel)
Plateforme (2001, Flammarion, trans. as Platform by Frank Wynne, 2002)
La Possibilité d'une île (2005, Fayard, trans. as The Possibility of an Island by Gavin Bowd, 2006)
La Carte et le Territoire (2010, Flammarion, trans. as The Map and the Territory by Gavin Bowd, 2012)
Soumission (2015, Flammarion, trans. as Submission by Lorin Stein, 2015)
Sérotonine (2019, Flammarion, trans. as Serotonin by Shaun Whiteside, 2019)
Anéantir (2022, Flammarion)

Poetry
 La Poursuite du bonheur, poèmes (1992, La Différence)
 Le Sens du combat, poèmes (1996, Flammarion)
 Renaissance, poèmes (1999, Flammarion)
 Configuration du dernier rivage, poèmes (2013, Flammarion)
 Non réconcilié: Anthologie personnelle, 1991-2013 (2014, Gallimard, trans. as Unreconciled: Poems 1991–2013 by Gavin Bowd, 2017)

Essays and other books
H. P. Lovecraft: Contre le monde, contre la vie (1991, trans. as H. P. Lovecraft: Against the World, Against Life by Dorna Khazeni, introduction by Stephen King, 2005), an analysis of the life and work of H. P. Lovecraft.
Rester vivant, méthode (1991, La Différence).
Interventions (1998, Flammarion), collection of articles (including the lengthy mini-essay "Approches du désarroi"), interviews, letters and poetry.
Ennemis publics (2008, Flammarion, transl. as Public Enemies: Dueling Writers Take on Each Other and the World, 2011), an exchange by e-mail between Michel Houellebecq and Bernard-Henri Lévy
En présence de Schopenhauer, L'Herne (2017)
Interventions 2020 (2020, Flammarion)

Articles
"Préface : Renoncer à l'intelligence" (1991) in Rémy de Gourmont, L'Odeur des jacinthes, Paris: Orphée / La Différence, pp. 7–20.
"Le haut langage" (1995) in La Quinzaine littéraire, 670; Paris; pp. 21–22.
"Un monde sans direction" (1996) in La Quinzaine littéraire, 700; Paris; pp. 8–9.
"Approches du désarroi" (1997), in Dix, Les Inrockuptibles / Grasset (lengthy article or short essay which provides a thorough account of Houellebecq's theoretical views, developed in his contemporary novels Whatever and Atomised, including an unflinching charge against consumerism and advertising).
"La question pédophile : Réponse" (1997) in L'Infini 59, Paris: Gallimard, pp. 96–98.
"Préface : L'Humanité, second stade" (1998) in Valérie Solanas, SCUM Manifesto, Paris: Éditions Mille et une nuits, pp. 63–69.
"Je crois peu en la liberté – Entretien" (1998) in Revue Perpendiculaire 11, Paris: Flammarion, p. 4–23.
"Michel Houellebecq répond à Perpendiculaire" (1998) in Le Monde 18 September 1998.
"La privatisation du monde" (2000) in L'Atelier du roman 23, Paris, pp. 129–34.
"Neil Young" (2000) in Michka Assayas (ed.) Dictionnaire du rock, Paris: Robert Laffont (second part of the article, co-signed with Yves Bigot who wrote the more chronological first part).
"Wilde Flucht" (2000) in Tageszeitung Berlin, 30 October 2000.
"Préface" in Tomi Ungerer, Erotoscope (2001), Éditions Taschen, Paris.
"Description d'une lassitude" (2002) in Houelle 10, Paris.
"L'homme de gauche est mal parti" (2003) in Le Figaro 6/1/2003, p. 1, 13.
"Préface : Préliminaires au positivisme" (2003) in Bourdeau, Braunstein & Petit (eds.): Auguste Comte aujourd'hui, Paris: Éditions Kimé, pp. 7–12. (translated as "Religion for Immortals," The Utopian, December, 2010).
"Mourir" (2005) on homepage.mac.com/michelhouellebecq (autobiographical account, written following the publication of Houellebecq non autorisé, which deeply disturbed the author).
"En présence de Schopenhauer" (2010) on Mediapart.fr, feb. 2010 (5 parts).
"Donald Trump Is a Good President" (2019) in Harper's Magazine, January 2019.
"Une civilisation qui légalise l’euthanasie perd tout droit au respect" (2021) in Le Figaro, 10 April 2021.

Audio albums
Le Sens du combat (1996) Paris: Les Poétiques de France Culture.
Présence humaine (2000) Paris: Tricatel.
Établissement d'un ciel d'alternance (2007) Paris: Grrr.

Published in collaboration
Judith Barry, Pascal Convert & Rainer Pfnür (eds.) (1993) Genius Loci, Paris: La Différence.
Le livre du plaisir (1999), Catherine Breillat (ed.) Paris: Éditions 1 (anthology of literary texts on the themes of sex, eroticism, pleasure — or lack thereof — selected and commented by Catherine Breillat).
Objet Perdu: fictions – Idées – Images (1995), Paris: Lachenal et Ritter & Parc Éditions.
Claus Hegemann (ed.) (2000) Kapitalismus und Depression II: Glück ohne Ende, Berlin: Alexander Verlag.
Dominique Noguez (ed.) (2002) Balade en Seine-et-Marne: Sur les pas des écrivains, Paris: Éditions Alexandrines.
Thomas Ruff & Michel Houellebecq (2002) Nudes, München: Walther König.
Sarah Wiame (drawings) & Michel Houellebecq (poems) (1993) La Peau, Paris: Sarah Wiame.
Sarah Wiame (drawings) & Michel Houellebecq (poems) (1995) La Ville, Paris: Sarah Wiame.

Works on Houellebecq
Manuel Chemineau, "Michel Houellebecq. Vive le trash!", in Wiener Zeitung, Extra (2 April 1999).
Thomas Steinfeld, Das Phänomen Houellebecq (2001).
Dominique Noguez, Houellebecq, en fait (2003).
Murielle Lucie Clément, Houellebecq, Sperme et sang (2003).
Olivier Bardolle, La Littérature à vif (Le cas Houellebecq) (2004).
Sabine van Wesemael (ed.), Michel Houellebecq (2004).
Fernando Arrabal, Houellebecq (2005).
Éric Naulleau, Au secours, Houellebecq revient ! (2005).
Jean-François Patricola, Michel Houellebecq ou la provocation permanente (2005).
Denis Demonpion, Houellebecq non autorisé, enquête sur un phénomène (2005).
Sabine van Wesemael,  Michel Houellebecq, le plaisir du texte (2005).
Gavin Bowd (ed.), Le Monde de Houellebecq (2006).
Murielle Lucie Clément, Michel Houellebecq revisité (2007).
Murielle Lucie Clément and Sabine van Wesemael (eds.), Michel Houellebecq sous la loupe (2007).
Lucie Ceccaldi, L'innocente (2008).
Marc-Edouard Nabe, Le Vingt-Septième Livre (2009).
Aurélien Bellanger, Houellebecq écrivain romantique (2010).
James Grieve, "A Mongrel in the Path: Prose and Poetry by Michel Houellebecq", in Art & Authenticity (2010).
Juremir Machado da Silva, "Um Escritor no Fim do Mundo: viagem com Michel Houellebecq à Patagônia" (2011).
Ben Jeffery, Anti-Matter: Michel Houellebecq and Depressive Realism (2011).
Bernard Maris, Houellebecq économiste (2014).
Samuel Estier, À propos du "style" de Houellebecq. Retour sur une controverse (1998-2010), Lausanne, Archipel (2015).
Nicolas Mavrakis, Houellebecq. Una experiencia sensible (2016).
Louis Betty, Without God. Michel Houellebecq and Materialist Horror (2016).

References

bibliography
Houellebecq, Michel